The Flying Fox of the Snowy Mountain 1999 is a Hong Kong television series adapted from Louis Cha's novels Fox Volant of the Snowy Mountain and The Young Flying Fox. The series was first broadcast on TVB in Hong Kong in 1999.

Plot
See Fox Volant of the Snowy Mountain

Cast
 Note: Some of the characters' names are in Cantonese romanisation.

Main cast
 Sunny Chan as Wu Fei
 Charmaine Sheh as Miu Yeuk-lan
 Felix Wong as Wu Yat-do
 Maggie Shiu as Long Kim-chau
 Marco Ngai as Fuk-hong-on / Chan Ka-lok / Kin-lung Emperor
 Joyce Tang as Nip Song-ching (Yuen Tsi-yee+Ma Chun-Fa)

Supporting cast
 Bell Liew as Yiu Yat-yat (Ching Ling-so)
 Wan Yeung-ming as Miu Yan-fung
 Eddie Cheung as Tin Kwai-nung
 Jo Jo as Nam Lan
 Gordon Liu as Shek Man-tsan
 Pau Fong as Mo-tsan
 Yung Kam-cheung as Seung Po-chun
 Chun Wong as Chiu Bun-san
 Lau Kong as Yim Kei
 Liu Kai-chi as Ping Ah-say
 Kwong Tso-fai as Man Tai-loi
 Fung Hiu-man as Lok Bing
 Li Kong as Yu Yu-tung
 Leung See-ho as Sam-yin
 Law Lan as Fuk-hong'on's mother
 Henry Lo as To Hei-mang
 Felix Lok as Lei Tsi-sing
 Law Lok-lam as Wu Sangui

TVB dramas
Works based on Flying Fox of Snowy Mountain
Television series set in the Qing dynasty
Hong Kong wuxia television series
1999 Hong Kong television series debuts
1999 Hong Kong television series endings
Television shows based on works by Jin Yong
Qianlong Emperor